Myrmisaraka is a Malagasy genus of ants in the subfamily Myrmicinae. Described in 2014, the genus contains two species.

Species
 Myrmisaraka brevis Bolton & Fisher, 2014
 Myrmisaraka producta Bolton & Fisher, 2014

References

Myrmicinae
Ant genera
Hymenoptera of Africa
Insects of Madagascar
Endemic fauna of Madagascar